The Seraph Award is a literary award for speculative fiction written in German. It is given annually during Leipzig Book Fair. The award is organized and overseen by the Phantastische Akademie.

Award 
In the category "Best Novel", all works published by a publishing house within the current calendar year  are eligible. The second category is "Best Debut Novel". This category includes prize money of 2,000 Euros. From 2012 to 2015, the award was sponsored largely by Stadtwerke Leipzig. Since 2016, the Leipzig Book Fair has been the main sponsor. The same year, a third category was established, awarding the best self-published novel ("Best Indie").

Selection process 
The winners are selected by a jury of 21 members who are newly nominated each year. The jury comprises fiction editors, journalists, bloggers, authors, literary agents, translators, booksellers, librarians as well as readers. The Phantastische Akademie and its supporters select the nominees from all submissions. From the list of nominees, the jury votes for the winners. The winners are announced at Leipzig Book Fair.

Winners 

Best Novel
 2012   :de: Christian von Aster  : Der letzte Schattenschnitzer. .
 2013   :de: Kai Meyer : Asche und Phönix. .
 2014   :de: Ju Honisch  : Schwingen aus Stein. .
 2015   Kai Meyer  : Die Seiten der Welt. .
 2016   :de: Nina Blazon  : Der Winter der schwarzen Rosen. .
 2017   :de: Katharina Seck  : Die silberne Königin. .
 2018   Michael Marrak   : Der Kanon mechanischer Seelen. .
 2019   Bernhard Hennen  : Die Chroniken von Azuhr - Der Verfluchte. .
 2020   Christoph Marzi  : Mitternacht. .
 2021   Ursula Poznanski  : Cryptos. .
 2022   :de: Joshua Tree  :  Singularity. .

Best Debut Novel
 2012   :de: Nina Marewski : Die Moldau im Schrank. .
 2013  :de: Mechthild Gläser  : Stadt aus Trug und Schatten.  
 and :de: Jan Oldenburg  : Fantastik AG. .
 2014   :de: Katharina Hartwell  : Das fremde Meer. .
 2015  :de: Akram El-Bahay  : Flammenwüste. .
 2016   :de: Daniel Illger  : Skargat. .
 2017   :de: Julia Lange  : Irrlichtfeuer. .
 2018   Theresa Hannig  :   Die Optimierer.   .
 2019  :de: Kris Brynn  : The Shelter - Zukunft ohne Hoffnung. .
 2020   :de: Bijan Moini  : Der Würfel. .
 2021   :de: Theresa Jeßberger  : Töchter der Freiheit. 
 2022   :de: Eleanor Bardilac  :  Knochenblumen welken nicht. .

Best Indie
 2016   :de: Hanna Kuhlmann  : Nachtschatten.
 2017 No "Best Indie" awarded.
 2018   :de: Janna Ruth  : Im Bann der zertanzten Schuhe.
 2019   :de: Birgit Jaeckel  :  Das Erbe der Rauhnacht.
 2020   :de: Erik Kellen and Mira Valentin  : Windherz. .
 2021   :de: Siegfried Langer  : Das Buch, das dich findet. 
 2022   :de: Tanya Hartgers  :  Crimson Dawn. .

External links 

 
 Homepage of the Phantastische Akademie  
 Seraph – Neuer Jurypreis für phantastische Literatur. In: buchmarkt News. 8 July 2011 (retrieved 27 February 2013)

References 

Fantasy awards
Fiction awards
German-language literary awards
Science fiction awards